Pilar Tosat (born 21 March 1931) is a Spanish fencer. She competed in the women's individual foil event at the 1960 Summer Olympics.

References

External links
 

1931 births
Possibly living people
Spanish female foil fencers
Olympic fencers of Spain
Fencers at the 1960 Summer Olympics